Swing Around the Circle is the nickname for a speaking campaign undertaken by United States President Andrew Johnson between August 27 and September 15, 1866, in which he tried to gain support for his mild Reconstruction policies and for his preferred candidates (mostly Democrats) in the forthcoming midterm Congressional elections. The tour's nickname came from the route that the campaign took: "Washington, D.C., to New York, west to Chicago, south to St. Louis, and east through the Ohio River valley back to the nation's capital".

Johnson undertook the speaking tour in the face of increasing opposition in the Northern United States and in Washington to his lenient form of Reconstruction in the Southern United States, which had led the Southern states largely to revert to the social system that had predominated before the American Civil War. Although he believed he could regain the trust of moderate Northern Republicans by exploiting tensions between them and their Radical counterparts on the tour, Johnson only alienated them more. This caused a supporter of Johnson to say of the tour that it would have been better "had it never been made." The tour eventually became the centerpiece of the tenth article of impeachment against Johnson.

Background
Johnson had first intended his approach to Reconstruction as a delivery of predecessor Abraham Lincoln's promise to benevolently "bind up the nation's wounds" after the war was won. However, as Congress began enacting legislation to guarantee the rights of former slaves, former slaveowner Johnson refocused on actions (including vetoes of civil rights legislation and mass pardoning of former Confederate officials) that resulted in severe oppression of freed slaves in the Southern states, as well as the return of high-ranking Confederate officials and pre-war aristocrats to power in state and federal government. The policies had infuriated the Radical Republicans in Congress and gradually alienated the moderates, who along with Democrats had been Johnson's base of congressional support, to the point that by 1866 the Congress had gathered enough antipathy towards the President to enact the first override of a Presidential veto in over twenty years, salvaging a bill that extended the life of the Freedmen's Bureau. Johnson also managed to alienate his own cabinet, three members of which resigned in disgust in 1866.

Thus the elections that year were viewed as a referendum on Johnson himself, who had not been elected President but had acceded to power upon Lincoln's murder. However, in Johnson's earlier political campaigns he had earned a reputation as a masterful stump speaker, and to that end he determined to undertake a political speaking tour (which at that time was unprecedented for a sitting President). His two dedicated supporters in the cabinet, Secretary of State William Seward and Navy Secretary Gideon Welles, joined him on the tour. In addition, to increase both his audience and his prestige, Johnson brought along heroes of the Civil War such as David Farragut, George Custer, and Ulysses S. Grant (by then the most admired living man in the country) to stand next to him while he spoke.

The tour

Initial success
In the 18 days of the tour, Johnson and his entourage made stops in Baltimore, Maryland; Philadelphia, Pennsylvania; New York City, West Point, Albany, Auburn, Niagara Falls, and Buffalo, New York; Cleveland and Toledo, Ohio; Detroit, Michigan; Chicago, Springfield, and Alton, Illinois; St. Louis, Missouri; Indianapolis, Indiana; Louisville, Kentucky; Cincinnati and Columbus, Ohio; and Pittsburgh and Harrisburg, Pennsylvania, as well as short stops in smaller towns between.

Because Presidents had traditionally not undertaken political campaigning in the past, Johnson's action was seen even before he began as undignified and beneath the office. Johnson's advisors, aware that the President could get carried away in his own sentiments, pleaded with him to give only carefully prepared speeches; Johnson, as he had often done on the campaign trail, instead prepared a rough outline around which he could spontaneously speak.

Initially, Johnson was enthusiastically received, particularly in Baltimore, Philadelphia, and New York. According to Johnson biographer Hans Trefousse, at each stop on the tour he had delivered

The press nonetheless gave him overwhelmingly positive coverage throughout the first leg of the tour (although the circumstances made his customary introduction—"Fellow citizens, it is not for the purpose of making speeches that I now appear before you"—a particular laugh line). However, when Johnson entered the Radical Republican strongholds of the Midwest, he began facing much more hostile crowds, some drawn by reports of his prior speeches and others organized by Republican leadership in those towns.

Disaster
Johnson's stop in Cleveland on September 3 marked the turning point in the tour. Because the audience was as large as it had been at previous stops, nothing seemed out of the ordinary; however, the crowd included mobs of hecklers, many of them plants by the Radical Republicans, who goaded Johnson into engaging them in mid-speech; when one of them yelled "Hang Jeff Davis!" in Cleveland, Johnson angrily replied, "Why don't you hang Thad Stevens and Wendell Phillips?" When he left the balcony from which he had spoken, reporters heard supporters reminding Johnson to maintain his dignity; Johnson's reply of "I don't care about my dignity" was carried in newspapers across the nation, abruptly ending the tour's favorable press.

Subsequent to this and other vituperative appearances in southern Michigan, the Illinois governor Richard J. Oglesby refused to attend Johnson's September 7 Chicago stop, as did the Chicago city council. Johnson nonetheless fared well in Chicago, presenting only a short and pre-written speech. However, his temper got the better of him once more in St. Louis on September 9. Provoked by a heckler, Johnson accused Radical Republicans of deliberately inciting the deadly New Orleans Riot that summer; again compared himself to Jesus, and the Republicans to his betrayers; and defending himself against unmade accusations of tyranny. The following day in Indianapolis, the crowd was so hostile and loud that Johnson was unable to speak at all; even after he retreated, violence and gunfire broke out in the streets between Johnson supporters and opponents, resulting in one man's death.

At other points in Kentucky, Ohio, and Pennsylvania, spectators drowned out Johnson with calls for Grant, who refused to speak, and for "Three cheers for Congress!"

Tragedy
Finally, on September 14 in Johnstown, Pennsylvania, a temporary platform built beside the railroad tracks for the president's appearance gave way, sending hundreds into a drained canal 20 feet below, killing thirteen.  Though Johnson attempted to halt the train and use it for triage for the injured, it could not wait due to conflicting train traffic.  A few members of the presidential party left the train to assist the victims, but Johnson and the rest of the party continued onto Harrisburg. To appearances, Johnson had callously abandoned the scene of massive casualties. Johnson gave $500 ($8,318 in 2016 dollars) to assist the victims.

Reaction

The press excoriated Johnson badly for his disastrous appearances and speeches. The New York Herald, previously the most supportive newspaper for Johnson in the entire country, stated that "It is mortifying to see a man occupying the lofty position of President of the United States descend from that position and join issue with those who are draggling their garments in the muddy gutters of political vituperation." The president was also the target of the two most important satirical journalists of the era—humorist David Ross Locke (writing in his persona as the backward southerner Petroleum Vesuvius Nasby) and cartoonist Thomas Nast, who created three large illustrations lampooning Johnson and the Swing that became legendary.

Johnson's Republican opponents took quick advantage of their good political fortune. Thaddeus Stevens gave a speech referring to the Swing as "the remarkable circus that traveled through the country" that "cut outside the circle and entered into street brawls with common blackguards." Charles Sumner, meanwhile, gave a stump speech of his own, encouraging his audiences to vote for Republicans in the fall elections because "the President must be taught that usurpation and apostasy cannot prevail."

Radical Republicans also began spreading rumors that Johnson had been drunk at several appearances. Because Johnson had been visibly and verifiably drunk at his own inauguration as vice president the year before, reporters and political opponents took his inebriation as fact and declared him a "vulgar, drunken demagogue who was disgracing the presidency."

Johnson's supporters, too, gave negative reactions to the tour, with former Georgia Governor Herschel V. Johnson writing that the President had "[sacrificed] the moral power of his position, and done great damage to the cause of Constitutional Reorganization." James Doolittle, a Senator from Wisconsin, lamented that the tour had "cost Johnson one million northern voters."

Aftermath

By the time he returned to Washington from the speaking tour, Johnson had even less support in the North than he had started with. His only remaining allies in Congress were Southern Democrats; since these were mostly former rebels, Johnson's reputation was diminished yet further by association. The Republican party would go on to a landslide victory in the congressional elections, and the new Congress would wrest control of Reconstruction from the White House with the Reconstruction Acts of 1867.

Johnson openly defied Congress and fought them bitterly for the control of the nation's domestic policy. However, the Republicans' vastly increased congressional voting bloc not only afforded them the political power to keep Johnson at bay, it gave the party sufficient votes to attempt impeachment of Johnson, first unsuccessfully in 1867 and again successfully in 1868. The Swing Around the Circle's impact was apparent even in the articles of impeachment, with the tenth of eleven articles charging that the President "did...make and declare, with a loud voice certain intemperate, inflammatory, and scandalous harangues, and therein utter loud threats and bitter menaces, as well against Congress as the laws of the United States duly enacted thereby, amid the cries, jeers and laughter of the multitudes then assembled in hearing." The article was specifically seen as being in response to speeches delivered in Washington on August 18, Cleveland on September 3, and St. Louis on September 8, 1866. During the impeachment trial, a number of reporters and other individuals were called on April 3 and 4, during the prosecution's presentation, to testify about speeches Johnson had made, including one in Washington, D.C. on August 18, 1866 (shortly before the commencement of the Swing Around the Circle) and in Cleveland, Ohio on September 3, 1866 (during the Swing Around the Circle). The impeachment managers neglected to bring the tenth article to a vote in the Senate when it became clear that it had insufficient support to result in a conviction.

The Republicans captured the White House in 1868 and maintained control of it until 1885, although Congress would continue to be the dominant force in government until the end of the 19th century. Thus, in effect, the Swing Around the Circle began a long series of political defeats that crippled Johnson, the Democratic Party and the presidency for several years.

See also 
 Presidency of Andrew Johnson
 Reconstruction Era

References

Bibliography
 Boulard, Garry The Swing Around the Circle: Andrew Johnson and the Train Ride That Destroyed a Presidency (iUniverse, 2008)
 http://www.harpweek.com/09Cartoon/BrowseByDateCartoon.asp?Month=November&Date=3
 https://web.archive.org/web/20100208005118/http://kids.yahoo.com/reference/encyclopedia/entry?id=JohnsonAn
 http://www.sewardhouse.org/house/
 http://www.nps.gov/anjo/historyculture/timeline.htm

1866 in American politics
Presidency of Andrew Johnson
Reconstruction Era